Hermann Nkodia is a Congolese professional footballer who plays as a defender for AC Léopards.

International career
In January 2014, coach Claude Leroy, invited him to be included in the Congo national football team for the 2014 African Nations Championship. The team was eliminated in the group stages after losing to Ghana, drawing with Libya and defeating Ethiopia.

References

External links

1988 births
Living people
Association football defenders
Republic of the Congo international footballers
Republic of the Congo footballers
2014 African Nations Championship players
Republic of the Congo A' international footballers
AC Léopards players